Varanus keithhornei, commonly known as the canopy goanna, Keith Horne's monitor, blue-nosed tree monitor, or Nesbit River monitor, is a species of monitor lizards  native to northeast Australia. It is a member of the Varanus prasinus species group.

This monitor lizard is found in a restricted area of less than 100 km2 near the Claudie and Nesbit rivers, in the McIlwraith and Iron Ranges of the Cape York Peninsula in northern Queensland.

Description
The colouration of V. keithhornei is dark black on the upper side. It has moderately big and smooth head scales. Its tail has no visible keel. The canopy goanna is small for a monitor lizard, reaching a total length up to 77 cm, but more robust than other species of the V. prasinus species complex, and can be further distinguished from them by its colour and the conical throat scales.

Specimens were originally assigned to the species Varanus prasinus by Czechura in 1980, but Wells and Wellington declared it a new species 5 years later.

Diet 
They forage in the trees and the leaf litter for insects such as orthopterans, roaches, and beetles.

References

Further reading
 Photos of Varanus keithhornei at Pbase.com
 Anonymous 2001. Opinion 1970 – Odatria keithhornei WELLS & WELLINGTON 1985 (Reptilia, Sauria): specific name placed on Official List. Bulletin of Zoological Nomenclature 58 (1): 74
 Bleeker, P. 1856. Reis Minahassa 1: 278
 Cogger,H.G. 2000. Reptiles and Amphibians of Australia, 6th ed. Ralph Curtis Publishing, Sanibel Island, 808 pp.
 Czechura, G. V. 1980. The emerald monitor Varanus prasinus (Schlegel): an addition to the Australian mainland herpetofauna. Mem. Qd Mus. 20: 103–109
 De Lisle, H.F. 1996. Natural History of Monitor Lizards. Krieger, Malabar (Florida)
 Eidenmüller, B. 2007. Small monitors in the terrarium. Reptilia (GB) (50): 12–19
 Sprackland, R. G. 1991. Taxonomic review of the Varanus prasinus group with descriptions of two new species. Mem. Queensl. Museum, 3 (3): 561–576.
 Wells, R. W. and Wellington, C. R. 1985. A classification of the Amphibia and Reptilia of Australia. Australian Journal of Herpetology, Supplementary Series, (1):1–61.
 Ziegler, T. & W. BÖHME 1998. Comments on the proposed conservation of the specific name Varanus teriae SPRACKLAND, 1991 (Reptilia, Squamata) (Case 3043; see BZN 54: 100–103, 250–251; 55: 37–39). Bull. Zool. Nomenclature 55 (2): 111–113.
 Ziegler, T., Schmitz, A., Koch, A. & W. Böhme 2007. A review of the subgenus Euprepiosaurus of Varanus (Squamata: Varanidae): morphological and molecular phylogeny, distribution and zoogeography, with an identification key for the members of the V. indicus and the V. prasinus species groups. Zootaxa 1472: 1–28

Varanus
Monitor lizards of Australia
Reptiles described in 1985
Taxa named by Richard Walter Wells
Taxa named by Cliff Ross Wellington